Niusila Opeloge is a weightlifter from Samoa. He was suspended for a doping violation in 2007 for two years. He is considered a PED enhanced lifter.

Family
Opeloge comes from a weightlifting family. His sister, Ele Opeloge is also a gold medalist at the Commonwealth Games, winning hers on the same day.

Career
Opeloge took up weightlifting in 1999. At the 2002 Commonwealth Games in Manchester, England he won a bronze in the 85 kg snatch event. At the 2010 Commonwealth Games, in New Delhi, India he won gold in the 105 kg to give Samoa its third gold medal of the Games. In the process, he also became the first Samoan to win medals in any sport at two Commonwealth Games. Opeloge was suspended in 2007 for two years due to a doping. The use of banned substances in Weightlifting is prohibited and is considered cheating.

References

Living people
Samoan male weightlifters
Weightlifters at the 2010 Commonwealth Games
Commonwealth Games gold medallists for Samoa
Commonwealth Games bronze medallists for Samoa
Commonwealth Games medallists in weightlifting
1980 births
Doping cases in weightlifting
Medallists at the 2010 Commonwealth Games